Sixth and Guadalupe is an under construction 66-story mixed-use hi-rise in Downtown Austin, Texas. On November 2, 2022, the building "celebrated its topping out", making it the tallest building in Austin, surpassing The Independent.

History
In 1925 a red-brick five-story hotel called the Alamo Hotel was built on the site. For a time this hotel was the home of Sam Houston Johnson, younger brother to President Lyndon B. Johnson. The Alamo Hotel was also featured, briefly, in the music videos for Rock the Casbah and Pancho and Lefty. and was a former stomping ground of actor Harry Anderson.

In 1984 the Alamo Hotel was torn down to make way for a 27 story office-hotel called Lamar Financial Plaza which, if built, would have been the second tallest building in Austin at the time, however, those plans were scrapped amidst the savings and loan crisis.

In 1998 the former site of the Alamo Hotel was replaced with a 97-room Extended Stay America, amid controversy.

In 2019 the Extended Stay America was torn down and ground broke on the current building. On December 31, 2021, Meta signed a lease to occupy all eighteen floors of leasable office space, however, on November 3, 2022, a Meta spokesperson said that in light of declining profits, Meta would instead sublease the office space it had signed a lease for.

Usage
Floors 2-12 contain 1,626 parking spots and 50 electric car charging stations, floors 14-32 contain 589,000 sqft of office space and floors 34-66 contain 349 residential units.

The building's shape is due to Texas Capitol View Corridors (#8, South Lamar at La Casa Drive).

References

Skyscraper office buildings in Austin, Texas